Project Awakening is an upcoming action role-playing game in a fantasy setting being developed by Cygames, and initially announced for the PlayStation 4 in September 2018.

History
Development of Project Awakening as a 'high-end console game' was announced at Cygames Next event (Tokyo) in November 2016, under development at Cygames Osaka studio.

A short gameplay video was shown in a closed session at E3 2018. The game was described as showing some influences from games such as Monster Hunter and Dragon's Dogma.

The game was officially announced as an action fantasy RPG in September 2018 for the PlayStation 4 system, with Junji Tago as the director, and Ryosuke Aiba as the art director.

Producer Kenichiro Takaki described the game as an open-world game, containing some RPG elements, with a focus on combat, including co-op multiplayer aspects - the game has a traditional high fantasy setting. The game was intended by Cygames as an attempt to break into the western console market - the name was also confirmed as only a working title. Takaki also discussed the possibility of the game becoming a PlayStation 5 title if development extended into the next generation of consoles.

In August 2019 a potential demo version was registered (16+) with the European ratings board PEGI.

References

External links
projectawakening.com, official website

Upcoming video games
PlayStation 4 games
Action role-playing video games
Video games about dragons
Fantasy video games
Open-world video games
Video games developed in Japan
Cygames franchises